Hawling is a small village and civil parish in the Cotswolds of England, close to Bourton-on-the-Water and Guiting Power. The Church, the Elizabethan manor house and the Rectory form a group of listed buildings. The population taken at the 2011 census was 224. Cheltenham is about ten miles away.

Local features
There is a Church of England parish church and a Methodist church in the village.

The Church of St Edward dates from the early 13th century, with alterations in the 15th, 16th, 18th and late 19th centuries. There are a number of interesting brass and stone monuments inside. The building forms a group with the Manor House and the Rectory, which are also listed.

The Manor House dates back to the Elizabethan era, and Elizabeth I was rumoured to have stayed there. The Manor was the residence of Mrs Dent-Brocklehurst, the mother in law and grandmother of Sudeley Castle's current owners. She was the mother of Mark Dent-Brocklehurst. The Manor along with the Rectory, Manor Barn and many more are open every Red cross day for Gardens.

Notable person
About 1646, the prolific writer and translator Clement Barksdale found refuge in Hawley from the English Civil War, taught at a private school there, and became Rector in 1650.

References

External links

Villages in Gloucestershire